The 1999–2000 South Pacific tropical cyclone season was an event in the annual cycle of tropical cyclone formation and ran from November 1, 1999, to April 30, 2000, in the South Pacific.

The regional tropical cyclone operational plan defines a "tropical cyclone year" separately from a "tropical cyclone season", with the "tropical cyclone year" for this season lasting from July 1, 1999, to June 30, 2000.

All of the six named storms affected land in some way, but no major damage was reported from any of the storms.



Seasonal summary

Systems

Tropical Depression 06F

Severe Tropical Cyclone Iris 

A disturbance was identified on January 3 at 06:00 (UTC) near Espiritu Santo in Vanuatu. The storm was difficult to locate the general centre for the next couple of days, but on January 6, it became more organised, while displaying midget characteristics. There were some indications that Iris could be far more intense than what the warning centres estimated, mainly due to its small size. Iris accelerated eastward, leaving Vanuatu. On January 9, Iris began its weakening trend, while moving closer to Fiji. Iris was downgraded to a depression on January 10, just 48 hours after it had reached its peak intensity.

Fresh to strong winds and very rough seas were experienced over the western and southern parts of Fiji. Overall damage was minimal. Cyclone Iris was most notable for its rapid strengthening in its early stages, followed by its rapid decay.

Tropical Disturbance 07F

Tropical Depression 08F

Severe Tropical Cyclone Jo 

A disturbance was first identified over northern parts of Vanuatu on January 19. It developed slowly, but deepened quickly on January 22, and advisories were issued on the system on January 23. It moved southward and was upgraded to Tropical Cyclone Jo on January 24 at 03:00 (UTC). Jo moved to the south-east and attained storm force winds 15 hours after being named. Jo moved further to the south-east, and moved close enough to affect Fiji. Flash flooding was reported, but there was no major river flooding.

Severe Tropical Cyclone Kim 

It initially developed little but late on February 24, the depression developed rapidly, and the storm reached tropical storm strength at 18:00 (UTC), named Tropical Cyclone Kim. Cyclone Kim reached hurricane strength on February 25, only 18 hours after being named, while moving to the south-west. Minimum pressure at this time was 955 mbar. Kim gradually weakened over cooler waters, still moving to the south-west. Cyclone Kim became extratropical south of Tahiti on February 29 at 06:00 (UTC).

Damage from Kim was minimal from Rikitea, since it was only a depression at the time. A pressure of 995.8 mbar was recorded. Overall, damage in French Polynesia was minor.

Tropical Depression 13F

Tropical Cyclone Leo 

Severe Tropical Cyclone Mona 

As Leo was developing, a new disturbance formed south of Apia in Western Samoa. The first gale warning was issued on March 7 as it moved closer to northern Tonga. Wind warnings were issued for some islands in Tonga including Vavau, Haapai and Tongatapu. A storm warning was put for the whole Tongatapu Group on the 8th. Mona moved south-southeastward and accelerated. Minimum pressure of Mona was 965 mbar. It began to weaken rapidly, as it sped off southwards, and became extratropical on March 11 at 12:00 UTC.

In the Vavau and Haapai groups, there was damage to crops, particularly to banana and coconut plantations. There was moderate damage to houses and school buildings in Tongatapu. The unofficial damage assessment, according to the Tongan National Disaster Management Office, totalled Tongan $6 million. A police patrol boat sank off Eua Island in the Tongatapu group.

Tropical Disturbance 16F

Tropical Depression 17F (Vaughan)

Tropical Disturbance 18F

Tropical Cyclone Neil 

On April 12, RSMC Nadi started monitoring a tropical disturbance, that had developed within a trough of low pressure to the northeast of Fiji. During the next day the system moved southwestwards towards Fiji and developed into a tropical depression, as convention around the center increasing. It moved slowly southward, but on April 16 at 12:00 UTC, it was downgraded to a tropical depression.

Damage from Neil was minimal. Kadavu and Ono-i-Lau in Fiji reported gales from Neil, while torrential rain was experienced over some parts of Fiji. There was one fatality due to drowning, but not directly associated with the cyclone.

Tropical Depression 20F

Tropical Depression 21F

Tropical Depression 22F

Other systems 
During that day the depression moved slowly towards the southeast, while weakening due to the influence of north-westerly windshear, before the final advisory was issued during September 6. Tropical Disturbance 01F and 02F then developed towards the end of November, but remained weak and did not significantly develop. On December 1, Tropical Depression 03F developed near the Vanuatuan islands, over the next few days the depression remained near stationary before it was last noted on December 3. Tropical Depression 04F developed near New Caledonia on December 5, over the next few days it moved quickly towards the east, before weakening during December 7, while located near the Tongan Islands.

On April 10, RSMC Nadi reported that Tropical Disturbance 18F had developed from an upper-level low, the system subsequently moved south-eastwards but was never classified as a tropical depression.

Tropical Disturbance 23F developed between Fiji and Vanuatu during May 6, and was briefly referred to as a tropical depression by RSMC Nadi but it develop further as it was sheared. Tropical Disturbance 24F subsequently developed near the Solomon Island of Rennell during May 20, and moved westwards into the Australian region over the next day.

Seasonal effects 

|-
|  ||  || bgcolor=#| || bgcolor=#| || bgcolor=#| || None || None || None ||
|-
|  ||  || bgcolor=#| || bgcolor=#| || bgcolor=#| || None || None || None ||
|-
|  ||  || bgcolor=#| || bgcolor=#| || bgcolor=#| || None || None || None ||
|-
|  ||  || bgcolor=#| || bgcolor=#| || bgcolor=#| || None || None || None ||
|-
|  ||  || bgcolor=#| || bgcolor=#| || bgcolor=#| || None || None || None ||
|-
|  ||  || bgcolor=#| || bgcolor=#| || bgcolor=#| || None || None || None ||
|-
|  ||  || bgcolor=#| || bgcolor=#| || bgcolor=#| || Vanuatu, Fiji || None || None ||
|-
|  ||  || bgcolor=#| || bgcolor=#| || bgcolor=#| || None || None || None ||
|-
|  ||  || bgcolor=#| || bgcolor=#| || bgcolor=#| || None || None || None ||
|-
|  ||  || bgcolor=#| || bgcolor=#| || bgcolor=#| || None || None || None ||
|-
|  ||  || bgcolor=#| || bgcolor=#| || bgcolor=#| || French Polynesia || Minimal || None ||
|-
|  ||  || bgcolor=#| || bgcolor=#| || bgcolor=#| || None || None || None ||
|-
|  ||  || bgcolor=#| || bgcolor=#| || bgcolor=#| || French Polynesia || Minimal || None ||
|-
|  ||  || bgcolor=#| || bgcolor=#| || bgcolor=#| || French Polynesia || Minimal || None ||
|-
|  ||  || bgcolor=#| || bgcolor=#| || bgcolor=#| || None || None || None ||
|-
|  ||  || bgcolor=#| || bgcolor=#| || bgcolor=#| || Queensland || None || None ||
|-
|  ||  || bgcolor=#| || bgcolor=#| || bgcolor=#| || None || None || None ||
|-
|  ||  || bgcolor=#| || bgcolor=#| || bgcolor=#| || None || None || None ||
|-
|  ||  || bgcolor=#| || bgcolor=#| || bgcolor=#| || Fiji || None || None ||
|-
|  ||  || bgcolor=#| || bgcolor=#| || bgcolor=#| || Queensland || Minimal || None ||
|-
|  ||  || bgcolor=#| || bgcolor=#| || bgcolor=#| || Queensland || Minimal || None ||
|-
|  ||  || bgcolor=#| || bgcolor=#| || bgcolor=#| || None || None || None ||
|-
|  ||  || bgcolor=#| || bgcolor=#|Not specified || bgcolor=#|Not specified || None || None || None || 
|-
|  ||  || bgcolor=#| || bgcolor=#| || bgcolor=#| || None || None || None ||
|-

See also 

 List of Southern Hemisphere tropical cyclone seasons
 Atlantic hurricane seasons: 1999, 2000
 Pacific hurricane seasons: 1999, 2000
 Pacific typhoon seasons: 1999, 2000
 North Indian Ocean cyclone seasons: 1999, 2000

References

External links 

 
South Pacific cyclone seasons
Articles which contain graphical timelines
2000 Spac